In mathematics, the Burnside ring of a finite group is an algebraic construction that encodes the different ways the group can act on finite sets. The ideas were introduced by William Burnside at the end of the nineteenth century. The algebraic ring structure is a more recent development, due to Solomon (1967).

Formal definition
Given a finite group G, the generators of its Burnside ring Ω(G) are the formal sums of isomorphism classes of finite G-sets. For the ring structure, addition is given by disjoint union of G-sets and multiplication by their Cartesian product.

The Burnside ring is a free Z-module, whose generators are the (isomorphism classes of) orbit types of G.

If G acts on a finite set X, then one can write  (disjoint union), where each Xi is a single G-orbit. Choosing any element xi in Xi creates an isomorphism G/Gi → Xi, where Gi is the stabilizer (isotropy) subgroup of G at xi. A different choice of representative yi in Xi gives a conjugate subgroup to Gi as stabilizer.  This shows that the generators of Ω(G) as a Z-module are the orbits G/H as H ranges over conjugacy classes of subgroups of G.

In other words, a typical element of Ω(G) is

where ai in Z and G1, G2, ..., GN are representatives of the conjugacy classes of subgroups of G.

Marks
Much as character theory simplifies working with group representations, marks simplify working with permutation representations and the Burnside ring.

If G acts on X, and H ≤ G (H is a subgroup of G), then the mark of H on X is the number of elements of X that are fixed by every element of H: , where

If H and K are conjugate subgroups, then mX(H) = mX(K) for any finite G-set X; indeed, if K = gHg−1 then XK = g · XH.

It is also easy to see that for each H ≤ G, the map Ω(G) → Z : X ↦ mX(H) is a homomorphism. This means that to know the marks of G, it is sufficient to evaluate them on the generators of Ω(G), viz. the orbits G/H.

For each pair of subgroups H,K ≤ G define

This is mX(H) for X = G/K. The condition HgK = gK is equivalent to g−1Hg ≤ K, so if H is not conjugate to a subgroup of K then m(K, H) = 0.

To record all possible marks, one forms a table, Burnside's Table of Marks, as follows: Let G1 (= trivial subgroup), G2, ..., GN = G be representatives of the N conjugacy classes of subgroups of G, ordered in such a way that whenever Gi is conjugate to a subgroup of Gj, then i ≤ j.  Now define the N × N table (square matrix) whose (i, j)th entry is m(Gi, Gj). This matrix is lower triangular, and the elements on the diagonal are non-zero so it is invertible.

It follows that if X is a G-set, and u its row vector of marks, so ui = mX(Gi), then X decomposes as a disjoint union of ai copies of the orbit of type Gi, where the vector a satisfies,
aM = u,
where M is the matrix of the table of marks.

Examples
The table of marks for the cyclic group of order 6:

The table of marks for the symmetric group S3:

The dots in the two tables are all zeros, merely emphasizing the fact that the tables are lower-triangular.

(Some authors use the transpose of the table, but this is how Burnside defined it originally.)

The fact that the last row is all 1s is because [G/G] is a single point.  The diagonal terms are m(H, H) = | NG(H)/H |. The numbers in the first column show the degree of the representation.

The ring structure of Ω(G) can be deduced from these tables: the generators of the ring (as a Z-module) are the rows of the table, and the product of two generators has mark given by the product of the marks (so component-wise multiplication of row vectors), which can then be decomposed as a linear combination of all the rows. For example, with S3,

as (3, 1, 0, 0).(2, 0, 2, 0) = (6, 0, 0, 0).

Permutation representations
Associated to any finite set X is a vector space V = VX, which is the vector space with the elements of X as the basis (using any specified field).  An action of a finite group G on X induces a linear action on V, called a permutation representation.  The set of all finite-dimensional representations of G has the structure of a ring, the representation ring, denoted R(G).

For a given G-set X, the character of the associated representation is

The resulting map

taking a G-set to the corresponding representation is in general neither injective nor surjective.

The simplest example showing that β is not in general injective is for G = S3 (see table above), and is given by

Extensions

The Segal conjecture relates the Burnside ring to homotopy.

See also 
Burnside category

References

Group theory
Finite groups
Permutation groups
Representation theory of groups